Saat Rang Ke Sapne is a 1998 Indian Hindi film directed by Priyadarshan and produced by Amitabh Bachchan. It is a remake of Priyadarshan's own 1994 Malayalam film Thenmavin Kombath. The film stars  Arvind Swamy and Juhi Chawla.

Plot
Forced into marriage with a mentally deranged man, Yashoda gives birth to a child, only to have her husband kill himself and the child, leaving her devastated and alone. This leaves her brother, Bhanu angry and bitter at this loss, and swears to avenge this humiliation. His vengeance is satisfied every year when he asks his employee and close friend, Mahipal to run a bullock-cart race, and defeat his sister's in-laws, and every year Mahipal wins. Bhanu, in his mid forties, has still not married, although he used to actively woo a village belle, who still has feelings for him. One day Bhanu and Mahipal give a ride in their bullock-cart to a couple, Baldev, and his sister Jalima, who are travelling and performing gypsies. During this ride, Bhanu hopelessly falls in love with Jalima, on one hand, and Mahipal wants to ditch the couple midway, as he does not like them.

Cast
 Arvind Swamy .... Mahipal Sharma
 Juhi Chawla .... Jalima
 Anupam Kher .... Bhanu
 Farida Jalal .... Yashoda
 Satish Shah .... Baldev
 Tinu Anand .... Prahlad Sharma (Mahipal's Dad)
 Sukumari .... Rampyari Devi, Yashoda's sister in law
 Mink Singh .... Bhanvari
 Aruna Irani
 Geetha Vijayan ....Mahipal's younger sister
 Govind Namdev....Pongad
 Khadeeja ....Tribal lady
 Mukesh Rishi ....Bhupat, a ruthless policeman, Jalima's brother-in law - who wants to marry her, had murdered his first wife
 Kanya Bharathi .... Rampyari Devi's daughter
 K. R. Vatsala .... Jalima's sister

Soundtrack
All the songs were composed by Nadeem Shravan and were penned by Sameer. The song "Saat Rang Ke Sapne" is based on "Poovenam" from Oru Minnaminunginte Nurunguvettam.

Reception
Komal Nahta of Film Information wrote  "Saat Rang Ke Sapne has form (colours, beautiful locations, excellent photography) but its content is far from satisfactory and its undue length, too disturbing".  Anupama Chopra of India Today wrote ″Priyan captures a few powerful moments but an inconsistent characterisation and a clunky plot progression hobble the film. Unlike Kamalahasan's powerful Thevar Magan script which inspired Viraasat, SRKS is unnecessarily convoluted and too dependent on unfortunate coincidences. The incessant tourist brochure-style scenery also begins to pall after sometime.″

References

External links
 

Hindi remakes of Malayalam films
1990s Hindi-language films
1998 films
Films scored by Nadeem–Shravan
Films directed by Priyadarshan
Indian comedy-drama films